Jock Lineen (17 February 1928 – 12 April 2022) was an Australian rules footballer who played with North Melbourne in the Victorian Football League (VFL).

Notes

External links 		
		
		
		
		
		
		
1928 births
2022 deaths
Australian rules footballers from Victoria (Australia)		
North Melbourne Football Club players